Bachendri Pal (born 24 May 1954) is an Indian mountaineer. She is the first Indian woman to climb the summit of world's highest mountain, Mount Everest, what she did in 1984. She was awarded the third highest civilian award Padma Bhushan by Government of India in 2019.

Early life
Bachendri Pal was born to a Bhotiya family on 24 May 1954 in Nakuri village, in the Uttarkashi district in the Indian state of Uttarakhand. She was one of five children to Hansa Devi, and Shri Kishan Singh Pal, – a border tradesman who supplied groceries from India to Tibet. She was born only five days prior to the first anniversary of the original ascension of Mount Everest by Tenzing Norgay and Edmund Hillary. She completed her M.A. and B.Ed. from D.A.V. Post Graduate College, Dehradun. On the invitation of her school principal, she was sent to college for higher studies and, during her course at Nehru Institute of Mountaineering, became the first female to climb Mount Gangotri  and Mount Rudragaria  in 1982. In that time, she became an instructor at the National Adventure Foundation (NAF), which had set up an adventure school for training women to learn mountaineering.

Pal encountered stiff opposition from her family and relatives when she chose a career as a professional mountaineer rather than a schoolteacher. However, she soon found success in her chosen field when, after summiting a number of smaller peaks, she was selected to join India's first mixed-gender team to attempt an expedition to Mount Everest in 1984.

Ascent
In 1984, India scheduled its fourth expedition to Mount Everest, christened "Everest '84". Bachendri Pal was selected as one of the members of the group of six Indian women and eleven men to attempt the ascent of Mount Everest (Sagarmatha in Nepalese). The team was flown to Kathmandu, the capital of Nepal, in March 1984, and from there the team moved onwards. Recalling her first glimpse of Mount Everest, Bachendri reminisced, "We, the hill people, have always worshipped the mountains... my overpowering emotion at this awe-inspiring spectacle was, therefore, devotional." The team commenced its ascent in May 1984. Her team almost met disaster when an avalanche buried its camp, and more than half the group abandoned the attempt because of injury or fatigue. Bachendri Pal and the remainder of the team pressed on to reach the summit. On the night of 15–16 May 1984, at around 00:30 hours IST, I was jolted awake; something had hit me hard; I also heard a deafening sound and soon after I found myself being enveloped within a very cold mass of material."

On 22 May 1984, Ang Dorje (the Sherpa sirdar) and some other climbers joined the team to ascend to the summit of Mount Everest; Bachendri was the only woman in this group. On 23 May 1984, the team reached the summit of Mount Everest at 1:07 p.m. and Bachendri Pal created history. She achieved this feat on the day before her 30th birthday, and six days before the 31st anniversary of the first ascension of Mount Everest.

After
Bachendri Pal continued to be active after ascending the highest peak in the world. She successfully led:
An "Indo-Nepalese Women’s Mount Everest Expedition – 1993" team comprising only women, which set benchmarks for Indian mountaineering when 18 people reached the summit including 7 women.
All women team of rafters in "The Great Indian Women's Rafting Voyage – 1994", which had 18 women in 3 rafts. It was a pioneering effort by women in successfully completing the journey in the river Ganges from Haridwar to Calcutta, covering  in 39 days.
This is the first success by any country.

Social service
Bachendri Pal, along with Premlata Agarwal and a group of ace climbers including Mount Everest summiteers, arrived in Uttarkashi and carried out relief and rescue operations in the remotest high altitude villages of the Himalayas that had been ravaged in the 2013 North India floods.

Awards and accolades
Bachendri Pal has been conferred with following awards and accolades:

Gold Medal for Excellence in Mountaineering by the Indian Mountaineering Foundation (1984)
Padma Shri – the fourth highest civilian award of the Republic of India (1984)
Gold Medal by the Department of Education, Government of Uttar Pradesh, India (1985)
Arjuna Award by the Government of India (1986)
Calcutta Ladies Study Group Award (1986)
Listed in the Guinness Book of World Records (1990)
National Adventure Award by the Government of India (1994)
Yash Bharti Award by the Government of Uttar Pradesh, India (1995)
Honorary Doctorate from the Hemwati Nandan Bahuguna Garhwal University (formerly known as Garhwal University) (1997)
She is the first recipient of the Virangana Lakshmibai Rashtriya Samman 2013–14, which was given by the Ministry of Culture, Government of Madhya Pradesh, India at Gwalior on 18 June 2013 for her personal achievement in adventure sports and women's upliftment in the country.
Padma Bhushan – the third highest civilian award of the Republic of India (2019)
 Bharat Gaurav Award by East Bengal Club: 2014

Books and publications
Everest – My Journey to the Top, an autobiography published By National Book Trust, Delhi,

Further reading

See also
List of Mount Everest records of India
List of Mount Everest records
List of Mount Everest summiters by number of times to the summit
H. P. S. Ahluwalia
Women in India –Status of women in India 

List of Indian women athletes
List of 20th-century summiters of Mount Everest

References

External links
Bachendri Pal Biography
Indian Autograph's profile

1954 births
Living people
Indian female mountain climbers
Indian mountain climbers
People from Uttarkashi district
Indian summiters of Mount Everest
Recipients of the Padma Shri in sports
Recipients of the Tenzing Norgay National Adventure Award
20th-century Indian women
20th-century Indian people
Sportswomen from Uttarakhand
Mountain climbers from Uttarakhand
Recipients of the Padma Bhushan in sports
Recipients of the Arjuna Award
Recipients of Indian Mountaineering Foundation's Gold Medal